Steve Quis is an American sportscaster who is based in San Diego, CA and employed by Spectrum SportsNet, ESPN, Bally Sports West, UC San Diego and San Diego Miramar College as Public Information Officer.

Broadcasting career
Quis currently calls college basketball nationally for ESPN and regionally for Spectrum SportsNet and Bally Sports West in Los Angeles. He is assigned Pac-12, WCC and Mountain West Conference games, along with the Wooden Legacy tournament and the NIT. Quis currently calls the Ford CIF Southern Section Game of the Week on Bally Sports West. He also calls Big West basketball, soccer, volleyball, softball and baseball for UC San Diego on ESPN Plus, Indoor Football for the San Diego Strikeforce, college baseball for Stadium and college wrestling for CBSSN. He also spent the 2012 and 2013 seasons calling Major League Baseball games for the Los Angeles Angels on Compass Media Networks. He has served as the Voice of the LA KISS Arena League team on KCAL-9 Los Angeles, Los Angeles D-Fenders NBA D-League basketball and the California State High School football and basketball championships for Spectrum SportsNet (Los Angeles). In fall 2013, he served as the television play-by-play announcer for UNLV basketball.

Before joining Compass Media Networks, Quis was the television voice of the San Diego Padres and was the pregame/postgame host on 4SD from 2006-2010. Quis was the Padres beat reporter for MLB Network and has been the television and fill-in radio voice of the San Diego State Aztecs football and basketball teams. He served as television announcer for University of San Diego basketball and football from 2006-2012. Quis was the host of The Steve Fisher Coaches Show on KOGO radio from 2010-2013.

From 2010-2021, Quis was the fill-in sports anchor at KFMB-TV San Diego and hosted Chargers Game Day on CBS 8 in 2013. From 2004-2010, he was the post game show host for the San Diego Chargers Radio Network. In 2004, he was the radio play-by-play announcer for the San Diego Riptide of Arena League2.

For Channel 4SD, Steve hosted Chargers Preview with Jim Harbaugh; Aztecs Magazine; The Brady Hoke Coaches Show; the High School Football Game of the Week; he was employed by the station from 2004 through 2012 where he was also co-anchor for its nightly half hour sports program Post Game.

Quis moved to San Diego in 2000 to join KUSI-TV as weekend sports anchor. He also served as the North County correspondent on the  Prep Pigskin Report where he covered Alex Smith, Reggie Bush, and current Vikings Head Coach Kevin O'Connell.

Quis has also worked at KOLD-TV in Tucson as a sports anchor/reporter, and KUSI-TV in the same role. He was the radio play-by-play voice, along with Mario Impemba, for Pacific Coast League Tucson Toros baseball from 1993-1999. He was the radio voice of University of Arizona baseball from 1991-1992. Quis is a three-time Emmy award winner.

Awards
Emmy Award for best sports feature - Adaptive Golf 
Emmy Award winner for providing play-by-play coverage of Trevor Hoffman's record breaking save in MLB
Bridgepoint Education Hero of the Year
Associated Press Arizona Press Award

Personal life
Quis grew up in Fullerton and is a resident of San Diego. He is a graduate of Fullerton Union High School and the University of Arizona.

References

1971 births
People from Fullerton, California
People from San Diego
People from Tucson, Arizona
Sports Emmy Award winners
University of Arizona alumni
American television sports anchors
American television sports announcers
American talk radio hosts
American radio sports announcers
San Diego Chargers announcers
Los Angeles Angels of Anaheim announcers
San Diego Padres announcers
San Diego State Aztecs football announcers
Women's college basketball announcers in the United States
National Football League announcers
College basketball announcers in the United States
Major League Baseball broadcasters
NBA G League broadcasters
College football announcers
College baseball announcers in the United States
Minor League Baseball broadcasters
High school basketball announcers in the United States
High school football announcers in the United States
Living people